Konstantin Andrianov (16 February 1910 – 18 January 1988) was a Russian sports administrator who was the first president of the Soviet Olympic Committee and a vice-president of the International Olympic Committee. In 1988, he was a recipient of the Silver Olympic Order.

References

External links
 

1910 births
1988 deaths
Russian sports executives and administrators
Recipients of the Olympic Order
Burials at Kuntsevo Cemetery